Albert Drach (17 December 1902 – 27 March 1995) was an Austrian-Jewish writer and lawyer. He was born in Vienna and died in Mödling. In 1988 he was awarded the Georg Büchner Prize by the Deutsche Akademie für Sprache und Dichtung for being a "courageous and sensitive contemporary witness who expresses the madness of our century without resentment in poetic poignancy".

Awards
 Georg Büchner Prize 1988

References

1902 births
1995 deaths
Austrian male writers
Lawyers from Vienna
Austrian people of Jewish descent
Georg Büchner Prize winners
Writers from Vienna
20th-century Austrian lawyers
20th-century Austrian writers